Abd Allah ibn al-Zubayr ibn al-Awwam (May 624 CE – October/November 692), was the leader of a caliphate based in Mecca that rivaled the Umayyads from 683 until his death.

The son of al-Zubayr ibn al-Awwam and Asma bint Abi Bakr, Ibn al-Zubayr belonged to the Quraysh, the leading tribe of the nascent Muslim community, and was the first child born to the Muhajirun, Islam's earliest converts. As a youth, he participated in the early Muslim conquests alongside his father in Syria and Egypt, and later played a role in the Muslim conquests of North Africa and northern Iran in 647 and 650, respectively. During the First Muslim Civil War, he fought on the side of his aunt A'isha against Caliph Ali. Though little is heard of Ibn al-Zubayr during the subsequent reign of the first Umayyad caliph Mu'awiya I, it was known that he opposed the latter's designation of his son, Yazid I, as his successor. Ibn al-Zubayr, along with many of the Quraysh and the Ansar, the leading Muslim groups of the Hejaz (western Arabia), opposed the caliphate becoming an inheritable institution of the Umayyads.

Ibn al-Zubayr established himself in Mecca where he rallied opposition to Yazid, before proclaiming himself caliph in the wake of Yazid's death in 683, marking the beginning of the Second Muslim Civil War. Meanwhile, Yazid's son and successor died weeks into his reign, precipitating the collapse of Umayyad authority across the Caliphate, most of whose provinces subsequently accepted the suzerainty of Ibn al-Zubayr. Though widely recognized as caliph, his authority was largely nominal outside of the Hejaz. By 685, the Umayyad Caliphate had been reconstituted under Marwan I in Syria and Egypt, while Zubayrid authority was being challenged in Iraq and Arabia by pro-Alid and Kharijite forces. Ibn al-Zubayr's brother Mus'ab reasserted Ibn al-Zubayr's suzerainty in Iraq by 687, but was defeated and killed by Marwan's successor Abd al-Malik in 691. The Umayyad commander al-Hajjaj ibn Yusuf proceeded to besiege Ibn al-Zubayr in his Meccan stronghold, where he was ultimately slain in 692.

Through the prestige of his family ties and social links with the Islamic prophet Muhammad and his strong association with the holy city of Mecca, Ibn al-Zubayr was able to lead the influential, disaffected Muslim factions opposed to Umayyad rule. He sought to reestablish the Hejaz as the political center of the Caliphate. However, his refusal to leave Mecca precluded him from exercising power in the more populous provinces where he depended on his brother Mus'ab and other loyalists, who ruled with virtual independence. He thus played a minor active role in the struggle carried out in his name.

Early life and career

Family
Abd Allah ibn al-Zubayr was born in Medina in the Hejaz (western Arabia) in May 624. He was the eldest son of al-Zubayr ibn al-Awwam, a ṣaḥābī (companion) of Muhammad and a leading Muslim figure. He belonged to the Banu Asad clan of the Quraysh, the dominant tribe of Mecca, a trade center in the Hejaz and location of the Ka'aba, the holiest sanctuary in Islam. Ibn al-Zubayr's paternal grandmother was Safiyya bint Abd al-Muttalib, the paternal aunt of Muhammad, and his mother was Asma, a daughter of the first caliph, Abu Bakr, and sister of A'isha, a wife of Muhammad. According to the 9th-century historians Ibn Habib and Ibn Qutayba, Ibn al-Zubayr was the first child born to the Muhajirun, the earliest converts to Islam who had been exiled from Mecca to Medina. These early social, kinship and religious links to Muhammad, his family and the first Muslims all boosted Ibn al-Zubayr's reputation in adulthood.

Ibn al-Zubayr had a number of wives and children. His first wife was Tumadir bint Manzur ibn Zabban ibn Sayyar ibn Amr of the Banu Fazara. She bore him his eldest son Khubayb, hence Ibn al-Zubayr's kunya (epithet) "Abu Khubayb", and other sons Hamza, Abbad, al-Zubayr and Thabit. She or another of Ibn al-Zubayr's wives, Umm al-Hasan Nafisa, a daughter of Hasan, son of the fourth caliph Ali and grandson of Muhammad, bore his daughter Ruqayya. Tumadir's sister Zajla was at one point married to Ibn al-Zubayr. He was also married to A'isha, a daughter of the third caliph Uthman ibn Affan. A'isha or Nafisa mothered Ibn al-Zubayr's son Bakr, of whom little is reported in the traditional sources. Ibn al-Zubayr divorced A'isha following the birth of their son. From another wife, Hantama bint Abd al-Rahman ibn al-Harith ibn Hisham, Ibn al-Zubayr had his son 'Amir.

Military career
As a child, during the reign of Caliph Umar in 636, Ibn al-Zubayr may have been present with his father at the Battle of Yarmouk against the Byzantines in Syria. He was also present with his father in Amr ibn al-As's campaign against Byzantine Egypt in 640. In 647, Ibn al-Zubayr distinguished himself in the Muslim conquest of Ifriqiya (North Africa) under the commander Abd Allah ibn Sa'd. During that campaign, Ibn al-Zubayr discovered a vulnerable point in the battle lines of the Byzantine defenders and slew their patrician, Gregory. He was lauded by Caliph Uthman and issued a victory speech, well known for its eloquence, upon his return to Medina. Later, he joined Sa'id ibn al-As in the latter's offensive in northern Iran in 650. 

Uthman appointed Ibn al-Zubayr to the commission charged with the recension of the Qur'an. During the rebel siege of Uthman's house in June 656, the caliph put Ibn al-Zubayr in charge of his defense and he was reportedly wounded in the fighting. In the aftermath of Uthman's assassination, Ibn al-Zubayr fought alongside his father and his aunt A'isha against the partisans of Uthman's successor, Caliph Ali, at the Battle of the Camel in Basra in December. Al-Zubayr was killed, while Ibn al-Zubayr was wounded sparring with one of Ali's commanders, Malik al-Ashtar. Ali was victorious and Ibn al-Zubayr returned with A'isha to Medina, later taking part in the arbitration to end the First Fitna (Muslim civil war) in Adhruh or Dumat al-Jandal. During the talks, he counseled Abd Allah ibn Umar to pay for the support of Amr ibn al-As. Ibn al-Zubayr inherited a significant fortune from his father.

Revolt

Opposition to the Umayyads

Ibn al-Zubayr did not oppose Mu'awiya I's accession to the caliphate in 661 and remained largely inactive during the course of his reign. However, he refused to recognize Mu'awiya's nomination of his son Yazid I as his successor in 676. When Yazid acceded following his father's death in 680, Ibn al-Zubayr again rejected his legitimacy, despite Yazid having the backing of the Arab tribesmen of Syria who formed the core of the Umayyad military. In response, Yazid charged al-Walid ibn Utba ibn Abi Sufyan, the governor of Medina, with gaining Ibn al-Zubayr's submission, but he evaded the authorities and escaped to Mecca. He was joined there by Ali's son Husayn, who too had refused submission to Yazid. Husayn and his supporters made a stand against the Umayyads in Karbala in 680, but were killed and Husayn was slain.

Following Husayn's death, Ibn al-Zubayr began clandestinely recruiting supporters. By September 683, he had taken control of Mecca. He referred to himself as al-ʿaʾidh biʾl bayt (the fugitive at the sanctuary, viz., the Ka'aba), adopted the slogan lā ḥukma illā li-ʾllāh (judgement belongs to God alone), but made no claim to the caliphate. Yazid ordered the governor of Medina, Amr ibn Sa'id ibn al-As, to arrest Ibn al-Zubayr. The governor, in turn, instructed Ibn al-Zubayr's estranged brother, the head of Medina's shūrṭā (security forces), Amr, to lead the expedition. However, the Umayyad force was ambushed and Amr was captured and subsequently killed while in captivity. Ibn al-Zubayr declared the illegitimacy of Yazid's caliphate and allied himself with the Ansar of Medina, led by Abd Allah ibn Hanzala, who had withdrawn support for Yazid due to his alleged improprieties. Ibn al-Zubayr also gained the support of the Kharijite movement in Basra and Bahrayn (eastern Arabia); the Kharijites were early opponents of the Umayyads who had defected from Caliph Ali because of his participation in the 657 arbitration.

In response to growing opposition throughout Arabia, Yazid dispatched a Syrian Arab expeditionary force led by Muslim ibn Uqba to suppress Ibn al-Zubayr and the Ansar. The Ansar were routed at the Battle of al-Harrah in the summer of 683, and Ibn Hanzala was slain. The army continued toward Mecca, but Ibn Uqba died en route and command passed to his deputy Husayn ibn Numayr al-Sakuni. The latter besieged the city on 24 September after Ibn al-Zubayr refused to surrender. The Ka'aba was severely damaged during al-Sakuni's bombardment. During the siege, two potential Qurashi candidates for the caliphate, Mus'ab ibn Abd al-Rahman and al-Miswar ibn Makhrama, were killed or died of natural causes. In November, news of Yazid's death prompted al-Sakuni to negotiate with Ibn al-Zubayr. Al-Sakuni proposed to recognize him as caliph on the condition that he would rule from Syria, the center of the Umayyad military and administration. Ibn al-Zubayr rejected this and the army withdrew to Syria, leaving him in control of Mecca.

Claim to the caliphate

Yazid's death and the subsequent withdrawal of the Umayyad army from the Hejaz afforded Ibn al-Zubayr the opportunity to realize his aspirations for the caliphate. He immediately declared himself amīr al-muʾminīn (commander of the faithful), a title traditionally reserved for the caliph, and called for all Muslims to give him their oaths of allegiance. With the other potential Hejazi candidates dead, Ibn al-Zubayr remained the last contender for the caliphate among the anti-Umayyad factions in Mecca and Medina and most of these groups recognized him as their leader. An exception were the Banu Hashim clan to which Muhammad and the Alids belonged and whose support Ibn al-Zubayr deemed important for his own legitimacy as caliph. The leading representatives of the clan in the Hejaz, Muhammad ibn al-Hanafiyya, the half-brother of Husayn ibn Ali, and their cousin Abd Allah ibn Abbas, withheld their oaths citing the need for a stronger consensus in the wider Muslim community. Irritated, Ibn al-Zubayr besieged the clan's neighborhood in Mecca and imprisoned Ibn al-Hanafiyya to pressure the Banu Hashim. Meanwhile, the Kharijites under Najda ibn Amir al-Hanafi in the Yamama (central Arabia) abandoned Ibn al-Zubayr once he forwarded his claim to the caliphate, an institution they rejected, and Ibn al-Zubayr refused to embrace their doctrine.

In the Umayyad capital Damascus, Yazid was succeeded by his young son Mu'awiya II, but Mu'awiya II wielded virtually no authority and died from illness only months after his accession. This left a leadership void in Syria as there were no suitable successors among Mu'awiya I's Sufyanid house. In the ensuing chaos, Umayyad authority collapsed across the caliphate and Ibn al-Zubayr gained wide recognition. Most of the Islamic provinces offered their allegiance, including Egypt, Kufa, Yemen and the Qaysi tribes of northern Syria. Likewise, in Khurasan, the de facto governor Abd Allah ibn Khazim al-Sulami offered his recognition. Ibn al-Zubayr appointed his brother Mus'ab as governor of Basra and its dependencies. In a testament to the extent of Ibn al-Zubayr's sovereignty, coins were minted in his name as far as the districts of Kerman and Fars in modern-day Iran; both were dependencies of Basra at that time. Nonetheless, his authority outside of the Hejaz was largely nominal.

Most of the Arab tribes in central and southern Syria remained loyal to the Umayyads and selected the non-Sufyanid Marwan ibn al-Hakam from Medina to succeed Mu'awiya II. The proclamation of Marwan as caliph in Damascus marked a turning point for Ibn al-Zubayr. Marwan's partisans, led by Ubayd Allah ibn Ziyad, decisively defeated the pro-Zubayrid Qaysi tribes, led by al-Dahhak ibn Qays al-Fihri, at the Battle of Marj Rahit in July 684. The surviving Qaysi tribesmen fled to the Jazira (Upper Mesopotamia) under the leadership of Zufar ibn al-Harith al-Kilabi, who maintained his recognition of Ibn al-Zubayr's suzerainty. However, in March 685, Ibn al-Zubayr lost the economically important province of Egypt to Marwan.

Meanwhile, negotiations collapsed between Ibn al-Zubayr and the Kufan strongman al-Mukhtar al-Thaqafi, who afterward took up the cause of the Alid family. He declared Ibn al-Hanafiyya caliph and, unprecedentedly in Islamic history, the mahdī. Al-Mukhtar's partisans drove out the Zubayrid authorities from Kufa in October 685. Al-Mukhtar later dispatched a Kufan force to the Hejaz and freed Ibn al-Hanafiyya. Mus'ab's authority in Basra and Khurasan was also beginning to waver, but was ultimately secured after he gained the backing of the powerful Azdi chieftain and military leader of Khurasan, al-Muhallab ibn Abi Sufra. Mus'ab also gained the defections of thousands of Kufan tribesmen and together they defeated and killed al-Mukhtar in April 687. Ibn al-Zubayr subsequently dismissed Mus'ab from office in 686/87 and appointed his own son Hamza as governor of Basra. The latter dispatched a force under Abd Allah ibn Umayr al-Laythi to drive out the Najdiyya Kharijites from Bahrayn after they overran the province, but the Zubayrids were repulsed. Hamza proved incompetent in his administration of Iraq and, following his failure to deliver the provincial revenues to the state treasury in Mecca, he was dismissed and allegedly imprisoned by his father. Mus'ab was reinstated shortly after, in 687/688. By that time, the Najdiyya Kharijites conquered Yemen and Hadhramawt, while in 689, they occupied Ta'if, Mecca's southern neighbour.

Suppression and death
The defeat of al-Mukhtar, who had opposed the Zubayrids and the Umayyads, left Ibn al-Zubayr and Marwan's son and successor Abd al-Malik (r. 685–705) as the two main contenders for the caliphate. However, Kharijite gains in Arabia had isolated Ibn al-Zubayr in the Hejaz, cutting him off from loyalists in other parts of the caliphate. In 691, Abd al-Malik secured the support of Zufar and the Qays of Jazira, removing the principal obstacle between his Syrian army and Zubayrid Iraq. Later that year, his forces conquered Iraq and killed Mus'ab in the Battle of Maskin. Al-Muhallab, who was leading the fight against the Kharijites in Fars and Ahwaz, subsequently switched his allegiance to Abd al-Malik.

After asserting Umayyad authority in Iraq, Abd al-Malik dispatched one of his commanders, al-Hajjaj ibn Yusuf, to subdue Ibn al-Zubayr. Al-Hajjaj besieged and bombarded Mecca for six months, by which point, most of Ibn al-Zubayr's partisans and his sons Khubayb and Hamza surrendered upon offers of pardons. Ibn al-Zubayr remained defiant and, acting on his mother's counsel, entered the battlefield where he was ultimately slain on 3 October or 4 November 692. 

In an anecdote recorded by 9th-century historian al-Tabari, when al-Hajjaj and his lieutenant commander, Tariq ibn Amr, stood over Ibn al-Zubayr's body, Tariq said of the latter: "Women have borne none manlier than he ... He had no defensive trench, no fortress, no stronghold; yet he held his own against us an equal, and even got the better of us whenever we met with him". Al-Hajjaj posted Ibn al-Zubayr's body on a gibbet where it remained until Abd al-Malik allowed Ibn al-Zubayr's mother to retrieve it. His body was subsequently buried in the house of his paternal grandmother Safiyya in Medina. The Umayyad victory and Ibn al-Zubayr's death marked the end of the Second Fitna.

Descendants 
Following his victory, Abd al-Malik confiscated the estates of Ibn al-Zubayr in Medina and elsewhere in the Hejaz. The caliph later restored some of the properties to Ibn al-Zubayr's sons after a request by Thabit. His eldest son, Khubayb, was flogged to death in Medina by its governor Umar II during the reign of Caliph al-Walid I (r. 705–715). Thabit, meanwhile, had gained particular favor from al-Walid's successor, Caliph Sulayman ibn Abd al-Malik (r. 715–717), who agreed to return the remainder of the confiscated estates to Ibn al-Zubayr's sons. Under the Abbasid caliphs al-Mahdi (r. 775–785) and Harun al-Rashid (r. 786–809), several descendants of Ibn al-Zubayr attained senior administrative posts, including his great-grandson Abd Allah ibn Mus'ab and the latter's son Bakkar ibn Abd Allah, who successively served as governors of Medina.

Assessment
Ibn al-Zubayr adamantly opposed the caliphate becoming an Umayyad inheritance. Instead, he advocated that the caliph should be chosen by shūrā (consultation) among the Quraysh as a whole. The Quraysh opposed the monopolization of power by the Banu Umayya and insisted power be distributed among all the Qurayshi clans. However, other than this conviction, Ibn al-Zubayr did not sponsor any religious doctrine or political program, unlike the contemporary Alid and Kharijite movements. By the time he made his claim to the caliphate, he had emerged as the leader of the disaffected Quraysh. According to historian H. A. R. Gibb, Qurayshi resentment towards the Banu Umayya is evident as an underlying theme in the Islamic traditions about Ibn al-Zubayr's conflict with the Umayyads and Ibn al-Zubayr was the "principal representative" of the second generation of the Hejaz's elite Muslim families who chafed at the "gulf of power" between them and the ruling Umayyad house. Though Gibb describes Ibn al-Zubayr as "brave, but fundamentally self-seeking and self-indulgent", the hostility to the Umayyads in traditional Muslim sources led to a general description of him as a "model of piety". Nonetheless, a number of Muslim sources condemned him as jealous and harsh and particularly criticized the fatal abuse of his brother 'Amr and his imprisonment of Muhammad ibn al-Hanafiyya.

Ibn al-Zubayr rallied opposition to the Umayyads in the Hejaz through his base in Mecca, Islam's holiest city, and his prestige as a first-generation Muslim with family ties to Muhammad. He aimed to restore the Hejaz to its former political prominence; after the assassination of Uthman, the region's position as the political center of the Caliphate had been lost first to Kufa under Ali and then to Damascus under Mu'awiya I. To that end, Ibn al-Zubayr developed a strong association with Mecca and its Ka'aba, which, combined with his control of Islam's second holiest city of Medina, furthered his prestige and gave his caliphate a holy character. 

Ibn al-Zubayr rejected the offer of support from the caliphate's Syria-based army partly because it would have obliged him to relocate to Damascus. Other cities were available to him, but Ibn al-Zubayr opted to remain in Mecca, from which he issued directives to his supporters elsewhere in the Caliphate. This restricted him from exercising direct influence in the larger, more populated provinces, particularly Iraq, where his more worldly brother ruled with practical independence. In Arabia, Ibn al-Zubayr's power had been largely confined to the Hejaz with the Kharijite leader Najda holding more influence in the greater part of the peninsula. Thus, Ibn al-Zubayr had virtually rendered himself a background figure in the movement that was launched in his name; in the words of historian Julius Wellhausen, "the struggle turned round him nominally, but he took no part in it and it was decided without him".

During his rule, Ibn al-Zubayr made significant alterations to the Ka'aba's structure, claiming that the changes were in line with the authority of Muhammad. He called himself the "fugitive at the sanctuary [Ka'aba]" while his Umayyad detractors referred to him as "the evil-doer at Mecca".

Timeline of the two caliphates
Three Umayyad caliphs reigned during the twelve years of Ibn al-Zubayr's caliphate between 680 and 692. The short terms indicated in the upper plot in light blue and yellow correspond to the tenures of Mu'awiya II and Marwan I, respectively. (Note that a caliph's succession does not necessarily occur on the first day of the new year.)

Ancestry

See also
 Zubayrids
 Urwah ibn Zubayr
 Hisham ibn Urwah
 Fatima bint Mundhir

Notes

References

Bibliography

Further reading

 
 

624 births
692 deaths
7th-century caliphs
Abu Bakr family
Companions of the Prophet
People of the Second Fitna
Banu Asad (Quraysh)
Hejaz under the Umayyad Caliphate